Clearwater Christian College (CCC) was a non-denominational Christian college in Clearwater, Florida on Tampa Bay from 1966 until 2015.

Student life

Clearwater Christian College students were composed of roughly 80% residence hall students and 20% commuters, and there were a variety of student activities and organizations for all students to participate in. There were Greek letter organizations, student government, intramural sports, fine arts groups, yearbook, political club, a student newspaper, and other opportunities.

The CCC intercollegiate athletics teams, known as the Cougars, participated in the National Christian College Athletic Association (NCCAA) Division II. The women's volleyball team won 13 national titles, including eight in a row during 2006-2013. The men's soccer team also won back-to-back national titles in 2009 and 2010. The women's soccer team won the 2012 and 2014 national title.

Clearwater was conservative and maintained student guidelines including a modest dress code, regulation of facial hair, limited physical contact between the sexes, and chapel attendance three times per week. Student rooms were inspected weekly for cleanliness, and a "white glove" inspection was performed once a semester. The college used a relational approach to discipline in order to facilitate a spirit of growth and restoration whenever possible.

Academics
CCC was known as a Christ-centered liberal arts college with a general education curriculum in the arts and sciences plus an embedded Bible minor for all students. The most popular majors were business, elementary education, and general studies, but there was increasing demand for the programs in the division of science: biology, pre-med, exercise and sport science, psychology, and mathematics. Education majors earned Florida state certification. The interdisciplinary studies major was available for students who wished to focus on two academic disciplines without having to assume the coursework of a double major.

Clearwater Christian College had an agreement with the nearby University of South Florida (USF) to offer its students ROTC programs in Army, Navy, Air Force, and Marines.

Study abroad
Clearwater encouraged its students to participate in study abroad and missions trips. In the final years of operation, the college offered study abroad trips for college credit during spring break and summer break to Austria, Costa Rica, England, France, Greece, Ireland, Israel, Italy, Scotland, and Wales. As a faith-based institution committed to serving God, CCC sponsored missions trips to international locations. Faculty, staff, and students ministered across the globe in Argentina, Brazil, China, Jamaica, Mexico, the Philippines, South Africa, Turkey, and Thailand.

Beliefs
Clearwater Christian College was a denominationally unaffiliated Christian college; however most of their faculty, staff, and students came from various Baptist and independent Bible church backgrounds. The college's doctrinal statement focused on the historic fundamentals of Protestant Christianity.

Students were required to attend Sunday services, chapel services, and spend time in Christian service. Small group, student-led devotional times occurred twice a week for prayer and peer edification, for all resident students.

History
In July 1965, Arthur E. Steele went to Florida looking for a place to found a Christian college, as a reaction to what the founders saw as trends in evangelical colleges away from biblical standards of morality. The school would emphasize doctrine and personal soul-winning, and was a reaction against the ecumenical movement, new evangelicalism, and ecumenical evangelism. Evangelist Jack Murray supported the founding as chairman of the Advisory Council.  These two founders were both graduates of Faith Theological Seminary, and had each served as a president of Shelton College.

Steele found Clearwater, Florida to be an ideal place to found a college. He soon acquired  waterfront at the eastern entrance of Clearwater. On September 17, 1966, the college officially opened with 15 students enrolled.

Clearwater Christian College received full accreditation from the Commission on Colleges of the Southern Association of Colleges and Schools (SACS-COC) in December 1984 and in 1998 gained reaffirmation for SACS-COC accreditation.

In January 1987, the Board of Directors named George D. Youstra to succeed Steele as president. In the following years, enrollment tripled, new buildings were added, 89 additional acres of property were acquired, and new programs were offered.

In May 2002, Richard A. Stratton assumed the presidency.

In the summer 2008, the College began its first graduate program in the area of Educational Leadership, and the Florida Department of Education granted full approval for Elementary Education graduates to be certified with a reading endorsement.

On May 7, 2012, John F. Klem became the fifth president of Clearwater Christian College. However, the economic downturn across America caused student enrollment to drop significantly.

On June 5, 2015, the board of directors of the College announced the closure of Clearwater Christian College effective immediately, citing "ongoing struggles with maintaining enrollment, rising costs, and challenging development efforts" as reasons for the decision.

Accreditation and memberships
Clearwater Christian College was accredited by the Commission on Colleges of the Southern Association of Colleges and Schools to award Associate of Arts, Associate of Science, Bachelor of Arts, Bachelor of Science, and Master of Education degrees.
CCC had been given Teacher Education Program Approval by the Florida Department of Education.

Clearwater was a member of the following groups:
 American Association of Christian Colleges and Seminaries (AACCS)
 Council of Independent Colleges (CIC)
 Florida Association of Colleges and Universities (FACU)
 Florida Association for Colleges of Teacher Education (FACTE)
 Florida Independent College Fund (FICF)
 Greater Clearwater Chamber of Commerce (GCCC)
 Independent Colleges and Universities of Florida (ICUF)
 National Christian College Athletic Association (NCCAA)
 Online Computer Library Center (OCLC)
 Safety Harbor Chamber of Commerce (SHCC)
 Southern Association of Collegiate Registrars and Admissions Officers (SACRAO)
 Tampa Bay Library Consortium (TBLC)
 Independent Fundamental Churches of America (IFCA)

References

External links
 
 Clearwater Christian College Facebook Page

Nondenominational Christian universities and colleges
Educational institutions established in 1966
Liberal arts colleges in Florida
Universities and colleges accredited by the Southern Association of Colleges and Schools
Buildings and structures in Clearwater, Florida
Education in Pinellas County, Florida
1966 establishments in Florida
Defunct private universities and colleges in Florida